James O'Reilly (1836 – July 26, 1887) was an American Roman Catholic priest.

From Topeka, Kansas, O'Reilly was appointed the first bishop of the Roman Catholic Diocese of Wichita, Kansas in 1887, but died on July 26, 1887, before his consecration.

Notes

1836 births
1887 deaths
People from Topeka, Kansas
Roman Catholic Diocese of Wichita
Religious leaders from Kansas
Catholics from Kansas
19th-century American Roman Catholic priests